The Caradrinini are a mid-sized tribe of moths in the family Noctuidae .

Genera
Andropolia Grote, 1895
Athetis Hübner, 1821
Bellura Walker, 1865
Callopistria Hübner, 1821
Caradrina
Conservula Grote, 1874
Elaphria Hübner, 1818
Enargia Hübner, 1821
Euherrichia Grote, 1882
Euplexia Stephens, 1829
Hoplodrina
Hyppa Duponchel, 1845
Ipimorpha Hübner, 1821
Nedra Clarke, 1940
Paradrina
Phlogophora Treitschke, 1825 	 
Platyperigea Smith, 1894
Proxenus
Spodoptera Guenée, 1852

References

 ITIS Standard Report Page

 
Hadeninae